Sgt. Will Gardner is an  American film directed and written by Max Martini. The film stars Martini, Omari Hardwick, Dermot Mulroney, Gary Sinise, and Robert Patrick, telling the story of a disabled Iraq War veteran, Will Gardner, who is suffering from traumatic brain injury (TBI) and posttraumatic stress disorder (PTSD) he sustained while in combat. After a series of setbacks, he goes on a cross-country motorcycle journey to reassemble his life and his family.

Cast

Production 
Martini and Michael Hagerty produced the film under Mona Vista Productions. Martini has pledged 30% of the film's proceeds to three charities that support veterans suffering from TBI, PTSD, and veteran homelessness.

References

External links 
 
 

2019 films
2010s English-language films
American adventure drama films
2010s American films